Melese endopyra is a moth of the family Erebidae. It was described by George Hampson in 1901. It is found in French Guiana, Brazil, Colombia, Ecuador, Peru, Bolivia and Honduras.

References

 

Melese
Moths described in 1901